Jørgen Jalland (born 9 September 1977) is a Norwegian former footballer.

Career

Club
In August 2003, Jalland joined Vålerenga from  Sandefjord.
In February 2007, Jalland returned to Vålerenga from Rubin Kazan.

Jalland was transferred to Hamarkameratene in March 2009 from Vålerenga. From 2005 to 2006, he played for the Russian club Rubin Kazan. In 2010, he rejoined Ørn Horten. He has also played for Sandefjord.

References

1977 births
Living people
People from Horten
Norwegian footballers
FK Ørn-Horten players
Sandefjord Fotball players
Vålerenga Fotball players
FC Rubin Kazan players
Russian Premier League players
Hamarkameratene players
Eliteserien players
Norwegian expatriate footballers
Expatriate footballers in Russia
Norwegian expatriate sportspeople in Russia
Association football midfielders
Sportspeople from Vestfold og Telemark